James Bliss may refer to:
 James Bliss (politician) (died 1891), Alabama legislator
 James C. Bliss (1933–2012), American electrical engineer

See also
 James Blish (1921–1975), American science fiction and fantasy writer